Alfred Edward Callick (24 September 1908 – 4 August 1972) was an Australian rules footballer who played with South Melbourne and Fitzroy in the Victorian Football League (VFL).

Callick, a recruit from South Melbourne Districts, made just one senior appearance for South Melbourne, in the 1930 VFL season. He remained in the league seconds until he joined Fitzroy, where he played 37 VFL games from 1933 to 1937.

References

External links

1908 births
1972 deaths
Australian rules footballers from Victoria (Australia)
Sydney Swans players
Fitzroy Football Club players